The 1959 Arizona State Sun Devils football team was an American football team that represented Arizona State University in the Border Conference during the 1959 NCAA University Division football season. In their second season under head coach Frank Kush, the Sun Devils compiled a 10–1 record (5–0 against Border opponents), won the conferenceb championship and outscored their opponents by a combined total of 272 to 151.

The team's statistical leaders included Frank Urban with 536 passing yards, Nolan Jones with 689 rushing yards, and Bob Rembert with 232 receiving yards.

Schedule

References

Arizona State
Arizona State Sun Devils football seasons
Border Conference football champion seasons
Arizona State Sun Devils football